Fosenhallen is an indoor multi-use ice rink in the village of Botngård in Ørland Municipality in Trøndelag county, Norway. It consists of a speed skating rink, with an ice hockey rink and a football field in the middle, as well as a curling rink. It opened on 14 September 2007.

References

External links

Official site

Ørland
Speed skating venues in Norway
2007 establishments in Norway
Indoor speed skating venues
Sports venues in Trøndelag
Sports venues completed in 2007